Bankview is a community within the Town of Drumheller, Alberta, Canada. It was previously a hamlet within the former Municipal District of Badlands No. 7 (then Improvement District No. 7) prior to being annexed by Drumheller in 1964. The community is located within the Red Deer River valley to the south of Drumheller's main townsite across Highway 9 (South Railway Avenue).

See also 
List of communities in Alberta

References 

Drumheller
Former hamlets in Alberta